Dervish Biçaku (1874-1952) was an Albanian landowner, and one of the delegates of Albanian Declaration of Independence.

He was born in Elbasan, today's Albania in a landowners family, with around 2100 hectares of land in Elbasan and Lushnje areas. His father was Jusuf Bey Biçaku, and his mother was Hedije Zogolli, aunt of Ahmet Zogolli, known as the future Albanian King Zog I. He finished his high school in  Istanbul. He was one of the organizers of the Congress of Elbasan in 1909, one of the sponsors, and was elected its chairman. Dervish Bey Biçaku was one of the financers of the Normal School of Elbasan. In 1912, he was a delegate of Peqin in the Assembly of Vlore, which declared the independence of the four Albanian vilayets from the Ottoman Empire. He was elected from the future prime-minister Ismail Qemali as future Minister of Finances but unexpectedly he expressed disagreement with Qemali's line of government and jumped on Esat Pashë Toptani's side.

At the end of WWII, right before the LANC forces took control in Albania, he settled in Lebanon, where he died in 1952.

References

Albanian politicians
All-Albanian Congress delegates
1874 births
1952 deaths
People from Elbasan
People from Manastir vilayet
Emigrants from Albania to Lebanon
Activists of the Albanian National Awakening
Albanian philanthropists
Dervish
Albanians from the Ottoman Empire